Saint John's Abbey is a Benedictine monastery in Collegeville Township, Minnesota, United States, affiliated with the American-Cassinese Congregation. The abbey was established following the arrival in the area of monks from Saint Vincent Archabbey in Pennsylvania in 1856. Saint John's is one of the largest Benedictine abbeys in the Western Hemisphere, with 110 professed monks. The Right Reverend Fr. John Klassen, OSB, serves as the tenth abbot.

A school founded at the abbey grew into Saint John's University in 1883.  17 buildings constructed at the abbey and university between 1868 and 1959 are listed on the National Register of Historic Places as the St. John's Abbey and University Historic District.

Establishment 
In 1856, five monks of Saint Vincent Archabbey in Latrobe, Pennsylvania, arrived in St. Cloud, Minnesota. They established a priory there and began to minister to the German immigrants in central Minnesota. One of the first ministries of the new community was Saint John's College, which would come to be known as Saint John's Preparatory School. In 1862 the community moved some miles west, into the wooded area of the valley, and again in 1865 to the shores of Lake Sagatagan. It was in this location that the community began to flourish, and in 1866 the priory was raised to the status of Abbey and the community elected Fr. Rupert Seidenbusch as the first Abbot.

Abbey Church of Saint John the Baptist 
By the early 1950s the monastic community had reached to a near 450 monks, and had outgrown the original abbey church and so plans were made to construct a new, larger worship space which could accommodate a larger congregation. The liturgical movement which would culminate in the Second Vatican Council was in full swing at Saint John's and so the new church was also to be designed with some of the anticipated liturgical changes in mind. (Following the Council, almost no changes needed to be made to incorporate the new liturgical rules.) The community contacted twelve architects and asked them to submit plans for a church which would "be truly an architectural monument to the service of God." In 1954 the community selected Marcel Breuer to design not only the new church but an addition to the monastic enclosure.

Breuer's design incorporated the traditional axis of baptistery, nave, and altar in a modern concrete structure. The monastic choir stalls and Abbot's throne were placed in a less traditional semi-circular shape around the main altar, which also served to invite the congregation closer. The church was designed so that even with a capacity of over 2000, the entire community was able to feel like they were intimately involved in the liturgy. Perhaps the most striking part of the design was the facade and bell tower, which itself was shaped like a large bell and sat suspended over the main entrance of the church. The "banner" rises 112 vertical feet in front of the church and houses the 5 bells which sound the hours and call the monastic and university communities to prayer. The north facade of the building is the largest wall of stained glass in the world and contains 430 colorful hexagons of abstract design.

Construction of the church began on May 19, 1958, and lasted until August 24, 1961. The church was consecrated in the fall of 1961 and serves to this day as the principal liturgical space of both the monastic community and the university. The monastic community gathers for Morning Prayer, Midday Prayer, Mass, and Evening Prayer every weekday and except for rare occasions these liturgies are open to the public. On the weekends there is not public Midday Prayer. All liturgical events in the Abbey Church are livestreamed on the Abbey website.

Grounds 
In addition to the preparatory school, the abbey also established Saint John's University, which was connected to the abbey itself by "Quadrangle", at the time the largest building west of the Mississippi River dedicated to education. The abbey also operates the Liturgical Press, one of the foremost liturgical publishing houses in the United States. Also located on the grounds of the abbey are the Collegeville Institute for Ecumenical and Cultural Research, the Episcopal House of Prayer (Diocese of Minnesota), the original Minnesota Public Radio studio, and the Saint John the Baptist Parish Center. The  grounds of the abbey comprise lakes, prairie, and hardwoods on rolling glacial moraine, and have been designated the Saint John's Arboretum. The abbey is the location of a number of structures designed by the modernist Bauhaus architect Marcel Breuer. The Abbey Church, with its banner bell tower, is one of his best-known works. The upper church houses the newly expanded Holtkamp Pasi organ with over 6,000 pipes. In its undercroft is a chapel that contains the relics of Saint Peregrine.

A historic district of 17 buildings at Saint John's Abbey and University was listed on the National Register of Historic Places in 1979 for having national significance in the themes of architecture, community planning and development, education, and religion.  It was nominated for being an architecturally and historically significant campus of a leading religious and educational institution of the Order of Saint Benedict.

The abbey is the setting for The Cloister Walk, a collection of essays on Christian spirituality by Kathleen Norris.

The grounds include the Episcopal House of Prayer, a retreat center affiliated with the Episcopal Church.

Ministries 

Outside of Saint John's, the abbey's monks serve 12 parishes along with various nursing homes and hospitals in the Diocese of Saint Cloud. .

The Saint John's Bible 
The abbey's Hill Museum & Manuscript Library houses the world's largest collection of manuscript images. This library is also the home of The Saint John's Bible, the first completely handwritten and illuminated Bible to have been commissioned by a Benedictine monastery since the invention of the printing press.

List of Abbots 
 Rt. Rev. Rupert Seidenbusch, O.S.B. (1866–1875) Named Bishop of the Vicariate Apostolic of Northern Minnesota
 Rt. Rev. Alexius Edelbrock, O.S.B. (1875–1889)
 Rt. Rev. Bernard Locnikar, O.S.B. (1890–1894)
 Rt. Rev. Peter Engel, O.S.B. (1894–1921)
 Rt. Rev. Alcuin Deutsch, O.S.B. (1921–1950)
 Rt. Rev. Baldwin Dworschak, O.S.B. (1950–1971)
 Rt. Rev. John Eidenschink, O.S.B. (1971–1979)
 Rt. Rev. Jerome Theisen, O.S.B. (1979–1992) Elected Abbot Primate of the Benedictine Confederation
 Rt. Rev. Timothy Kelly, O.S.B. (1992–2000)
 Rt. Rev. John Klassen, O.S.B. (2000–present)

References

External links
Saint John's Abbey
Liturgical Press
Digital Image Collection of Saint John's Abbey
St John's Abbey Church on Architectuul

1856 establishments in Minnesota Territory
Saint John's
Buildings and structures in Stearns County, Minnesota
Churches in Stearns County, Minnesota
Churches in the Roman Catholic Diocese of Saint Cloud
Historic districts on the National Register of Historic Places in Minnesota
Marcel Breuer buildings
National Register of Historic Places in Stearns County, Minnesota
Properties of religious function on the National Register of Historic Places in Minnesota
Religious organizations established in 1856
Tourist attractions in Stearns County, Minnesota